Catherine Susan Swift is a Canadian businesswoman. She is the former Chair of the Board of the Canadian Federation of Independent Business. She is currently the spokesperson for Working Canadians.

Swift studied at the University of Toronto and Carleton University in Ottawa, receiving a B.A. (Honours) in Economics in 1977 and an MA in Economics in 1980.

Swift has a background with the Canadian federal government from 1976 to 1983, in the Departments of Consumer and Corporate Affairs, Industry and Communications. She was Senior Economist with the Toronto-Dominion Bank from 1983 to 1987.

Swift joined the Canadian Federation of Independent Business as Chief Economist in 1987. She became President in 1995, CEO in 1997, and Chair in June 1999.
For the CFIB, Swift coordinated policy issues at the federal and provincial level, and she represented CFIB to government and civil society members. From 2009 to 2014 she was the President of the International Small Business Congress, representing the interests of small- and medium-sized businesses globally.

Swift is a former president of the Empire Club, former Board member of the CD Howe Institute, the Canadian Youth Business Foundation, and SOS Children's Villages Canada.

As the head of CFIB, she was widely published in journals, magazines and other media on issues such as free trade, finance, entrepreneurship and issues facing small business owners, particularly female entrepreneurs. She contributed the article in The Canadian Encyclopedia entitled Small Business, and wrote for Canadian newspaper, The Globe and Mail, and the National Post, among others, about small business issues.

References 

Living people
Canadian chief executives
University of Toronto alumni
Carleton University alumni
Canadian women business executives
Canadian nonprofit executives
Year of birth missing (living people)